A base tunnel is a type of tunnel, mainly a railway tunnel, that is built through the base of a mountain pass.  This type of tunnel typically connects two valleys at about the same altitudes.

When originally constructed, classical railway lines through mountainous terrain tried to minimize tunneling, due to technical limitations and expense, and therefore required long and steep gradients and many curves, or even spirals. Tunnels were generally short and much higher up the mountain. Such tunnels are sometimes also called culmination tunnels, especially in the presence of a base tunnel through the same mountain massif.

The base tunnels take the opposite approach, minimizing or eliminating gradients and curves with the consequence of having longer tunnels but shorter total distances to travel. 
This allows for higher speeds and lower energy costs. 

Some of the best-known base tunnels are (with length, opening and location):

 Mont d'Ambin Base Tunnel (proj. 2032), France and Italy
 Gotthard Base Tunnel (2016), Switzerland
 Brenner Base Tunnel (proj. 2025), Austria and Italy
 Lötschberg Base Tunnel (2007), Switzerland
 Koralm Tunnel (proj. 2026), Austria
 Semmering Base Tunnel (proj. 2027), Austria
 Valico Tunnel (proj. 2025), Italy
 Pajares Base Tunnel (proj. 2012, but currently not usable), Spain
 Zimmerberg Base Tunnel (planned), Switzerland
 Simplon Tunnel (1906/1921), Switzerland
 Apennine Base Tunnel (1934), Italy
 Ceneri Base Tunnel (2020), Switzerland
 Furka Base Tunnel (1982), Switzerland
 Ore Mountain Base Tunnel as part of the Dresden Prague High Speed Railway Line (Czech Republic and Germany)

References